Hasselt is a city in the municipality of Zwartewaterland about 7 km (4.3 mi) north of Zwolle, in the Dutch province of Overijssel. After it received city rights in 1252, it became a member of the Hanseatic League around 1350. The city suffered an economic downfall from about 1550 on, as other cities proved to be better situated and equipped for trade and commerce. In 2001 the municipalities of Hasselt, Genemuiden and Zwartsluis were united in the municipality of Zwartewaterland, of which Hasselt became the administrative centre. As of 1 January 2021, Hasselt had a population of 7,385.

Gallery

References

External links

Website van de molen

Cities in the Netherlands
Municipalities of the Netherlands disestablished in 2001
Populated places in Overijssel
Former municipalities of Overijssel
Zwartewaterland